KWFI-FM is a commercial radio station located in Aberdeen, Idaho, broadcasting on 96.1 FM. KWFI-FM airs a country music format branded as "96.1 & 102.1 The Wolf".

History
On September 26, 2011, the then-KID-FM rebranded from "The Bull" to "River Country", now simulcasting on KWFO 102.1 FM Driggs, Idaho.

On October 25, 2018, KID-FM rebranded from "River Country" to "The Wolf". The station changed its call sign to KWFI-FM on November 26, 2018.

Ownership
In October 2007, a deal was reached for KID-FM to be acquired by GAP Broadcasting II LLC (Samuel Weller, president) from Clear Channel Communications as part of a 57 station deal with a total reported sale price of $74.78 million. What eventually became GapWest Broadcasting was folded into Townsquare Media on August 13, 2010; Townsquare, in turn, sold its Idaho Falls–Pocatello stations to Rich Broadcasting in 2011.

References

External links
Official Website
Flash Stream

WFI-FM
Country radio stations in the United States
Radio stations established in 1965
1965 establishments in Idaho